Mallocera is a genus of beetles in the family Cerambycidae, containing the following species:

 Mallocera amazonica Bates, 1870
 Mallocera glauca Audinet-Serville, 1833
 Mallocera ramosa Gounelle, 1909
 Mallocera simplex White, 1853
 Mallocera spinicollis Bates, 1872
 Mallocera umbrosa Gounelle, 1909

References

Elaphidiini